Gordon Jay Wells (born May 18, 1959) is a Canadian former professional ice hockey coach and former player.  He was nicknamed "The Hammer" for his tough, physical style of play.

Playing career
Jay Wells played his junior hockey with the Kingston Canadians of the OMJHL from 1976–1979, playing in 175 games, and earning 60 points (19 goals-41 assists), along with 385 penalty minutes.  He also had 14 points (4G-10A) in 30 playoff games.  A solid stay-at-home defenceman, Wells was drafted by the Los Angeles Kings in the first round, 16th overall in the 1979 NHL Entry Draft.

Wells began the 1979–80 season with the Binghamton Dusters of the AHL, getting 6 assists in 28 games, before joining the Kings, where he had no points in 43 games.  He also had no points in 4 playoff games.  Wells spent the entire 1980–81 season with Los Angeles, where he got 18 points (5G-13A) in 72 games, and had no points in 4 playoff games.  In 1981–82, he played in 60 games, getting 9 points (1G-8A), then added 4 points (1G-3A) in 10 playoff games.  Wells offensive production increased in 1982–83, when he got 15 points (3G-12A) in 69 games, and in 1983–84, he set a career high with 21 points (3G-18A) in 69 games, however the Kings failed to make the playoffs in both years.  Wells then had 11 points (2G-9A) in 77 games in 1984–85, helping the Kings return to the playoffs, where he recorded an assist in 3 games.  Wells had the best season of his career in 1985–86, getting 42 points (11G-31A) in 79 games, however Los Angeles failed to make the playoffs.  In 1986–87, Wells had 36 points (7G-29A) in 77 games, and added 3 points (1G-2A) in 5 playoff games.  Wells then had 25 points (2G-23A) in 58 games, and had 3 points (1G-2A) in 5 playoff games for the Kings in 1987–88.  On September 29, 1988, Wells was traded from the Kings to the Philadelphia Flyers for Doug Crossman.

In Wells' first season with the Flyers in 1988–89, he registered 21 points (2G-19A) in 67 games, and added 2 points (0G-2A) in 18 playoff games.  He began the 1989–90 season with Philadelphia, earning 19 points (3G-16A) in 59 games, before being traded to the Buffalo Sabres on March 5, 1990, along with the Flyers fourth-round pick in the 1991 NHL Entry Draft in exchange for Kevin Maguire and the Sabres second-round choice in the 1990 NHL Entry Draft.

Wells would play one regular season game with Buffalo in 1989–90, getting an assist in the game before suffering an injury, however he returned in the playoffs and went pointless in six games.  In 1990–91, Wells had three points (1G-2A) in 43 games with Buffalo, and in one playoff game, he earned an assist.  Wells began the 1991–92 with the Sabres, earning 11 points (2G-9A) in 41 games, before being traded to the New York Rangers on March 9, 1992, in exchange for Randy Moller.

Wells played in 11 games for the Rangers at the end of the 1991–92 season, getting no points, and in 13 playoff games, he chipped in with two assists.  In 1992–93, Wells had 10 points (1G-9A) in 53 games, however the Rangers failed to qualify for the playoffs.  He returned to the team in 1993–94, and had 9 points (2G-7A) in 79 games.  Wells played a huge defensive role for the Rangers in the playoffs, as he helped the Rangers win the Stanley Cup for the first time since 1940.  He played in 23 playoff games, registering no points.  Wells had 9 points (2G-7A) for the Rangers in 1994–95 in 43 games, and went pointless in 10 playoff games.  On July 31, 1995, the Rangers traded Wells to the St. Louis Blues for Doug Lidster.

Wells played in 76 games with the Blues in 1995–96, getting 3 points (0G-3A), and in 12 play-off games, he earned an assist.  He was granted free agency after the season, and on August 3, 1996, Wells signed a contract with the Tampa Bay Lightning.  In 1996–97, Wells would go pointless in 21 games with Tampa Bay, and retired from the NHL after the season after an 18-year playing career. In 2007, he was named coach of the Brantford Golden Eagles before signing with the  AHL's Manitoba Moose as an assistant coach from 2008 to 2011. Since 2011, Wells has been an assistant coach with the Barrie Colts of the Ontario Hockey League.

Career statistics

Regular season and playoffs

International

Awards and achievements
OMJHL First Team All-Star (1979)
1993–94 Stanley Cup Champion (New York Rangers)

See also
List of NHL players with 1000 games played
List of NHL players with 2000 career penalty minutes

References

External links
 

1959 births
Buffalo Sabres players
Canadian ice hockey defencemen
Kingston Canadians players
Living people
Los Angeles Kings draft picks
Los Angeles Kings players
Manitoba Moose coaches
National Hockey League first-round draft picks
New York Rangers players
Philadelphia Flyers players
St. Louis Blues players
Tampa Bay Lightning players
Ice hockey people from Ontario
Sportspeople from the County of Brant
Canadian ice hockey coaches